The 1901 Michigan Agricultural Aggies football team was an American football team that represented Michigan Agricultural College (now known as Michigan State University) as an independent during the 1901 college football season. In its first year under head coach George Denman, the team compiled a 3–4–1 record and outscored opponents by a total of 120 to 94. The team played its home games at College Field in East Lansing, Michigan.

Schedule

References

Michigan Agricultural
Michigan State Spartans football seasons
Michigan Agricultural Aggies football